The Roman Catholic Diocese of Isangi is a Latin suffragan diocese in the Ecclesiastical province of Kisangani in the Democratic Republic of the Congo .

Its cathedral episcopal see is the Cathédrale Marie Médiatrice (Mary Mediatrix) located in the city of Isangi .

History
 June 14, 1951: Established as Apostolic Prefecture of Isangi on territories split off from the then Apostolic Vicariate of Basankusu, Apostolic Vicariate of Coquilhatville, Apostolic Vicariate of Lisala and Apostolic Vicariate of Stanleyville
 July 2, 1962: Promoted as Diocese of Isangi

Bishops

Ordinaries, in reverse chronological order
 Bishops of Isangi (Latin Rite), below
 Bishop Dieudonné Madrapile Tanzi (2016.04.02 - Present)
 Bishop Camille Lembi Zaneli (2000.06.02 - 2011.07.08)
 Bishop Louis Mbwôl-Mpasi, O.M.I. (1988.09.01 – 1997.05.20), appointed Bishop of Idiofa
 Bishop Lodewijk Antoon Jansen, S.M.M. (1962.07.02 – 1988.04.20); see below
 Prefect Apostolic of Isangi (Latin Rite), below
 Father Lodewijk Antoon Jansen, S.M.M. (1952 – 1962.07.02); see above

Auxiliary bishop
  Louis Mbwôl-Mpasi, O.M.I. (1984-1988), appointed Bishop here

See also
 Roman Catholicism in the Democratic Republic of the Congo

Sources and external links 
 GCatholic.org
 Catholic Hierarchy

Roman Catholic dioceses in the Democratic Republic of the Congo
Christian organizations established in 1951
Roman Catholic dioceses and prelatures established in the 20th century
1951 establishments in the Belgian Congo
Roman Catholic Ecclesiastical Province of Kisangani